Shakhmaty v SSSR (Chess in the USSR) was a Soviet chess magazine published between 1931 and 1991. It was edited by Viacheslav Ragozin for several years.  Yuri Averbakh was also an editor.  From 1921 or 1925 through 1930 it was titled Shakhmatny Listok (Chess Papers) and edited by Alexander Ilyin-Genevsky.  The circulation was 55,000. The magazine was published by the USSR Chess Federation.

Notes

External links
 WorldCat

1913 establishments in the Russian Empire
1991 disestablishments in the Soviet Union
Chess in the Soviet Union
Chess periodicals
Magazines established in 1913
Magazines disestablished in 1991
Magazines published in Moscow
Russian-language magazines
Sports magazines published in Russia
Magazines published in the Soviet Union